William "Canada Bill" Jones (c. 1837–1877) was an English-born confidence artist, riverboat gambler and card sharp in Canada and the United States. He has been described by historians, news reporters and others who have written about his life since the late 19th century with such superlatives as "the greatest of confidence men" and "without doubt the greatest three-card-monte sharp ever to work the boats, perhaps the greatest of them all."

Life
Born in a Romanichal tent in Yorkshire, England, Jones learned the techniques of his future trade at a young age, and honed his skills into his late teenage years. In 1860, he emigrated to Canada, where he learned and perfected his three-card monte skills while travelling with Dick Cady as a "thrower". Heading south to the United States, he found success as a Mississippi riverboat gambler, teaming up with George Devol, Holly Chappell and Tom Brown. Brown's share alone was reportedly $240,000. After the foursome broke up, Jones and Devol continued working the boats until the pair severed their relationship sometime around the outbreak of the American Civil War when both accused each other of cheating.

Several people who knew Jones personally reported that he was generally a kind and charitable man. A detective described him "as gentle as a woman and as cunning as a fox" and "could beat any man at his own game", adding that Jones liked to "snake in" the greenhorns. Devol stated that he once witnessed Jones hand $50 to a Sister of Charity he passed on the street. According to Allan Pinkerton, founder of America's Pinkerton National Detective Agency:

Post-war, Jones moved to Kansas City, where he partnered with "Dutch Charlie". After winning $200,000 there, they began working the Omaha, Nebraska to Kansas City trains until the Union Pacific Railroad management started clamping down on three-card monte players. In response, Jones wrote to the general superintendent of the railroad, offering $10,000 a year to secure an exclusive franchise while other accounts reported that he offered Union Pacific's officers $1000 a month or $30,000 a year if they would let him play monte on their trains, but those offers were rebuffed.

Jones moved on to Chicago, in 1874, teaming up with Jimmy Porter and "Colonel" Charlie Starr. While there, he opened and worked four gambling houses, all reportedly with criminal histories. Winning and losing as much as $150,000 in a year, he reportedly was often duped by other gamblers during short card cons. Moving on to Cleveland with Porter, he continued to lose to professionals there as fast as he won from his marks.

After relocating to Berks County, Pennsylvania in 1877, Jones fell ill with consumption (tuberculosis). A pauper, he was admitted to the charity hospital in Reading, Pennsylvania for treatment. Roughly 40 years old at the time of his death there on October 22, 1877, he was buried at Reading's Charles Evans Cemetery. Reading's mayor was later reimbursed for the funeral by the gamblers of Chicago. John Quinn wrote in Fools of Fortune that:

In popular culture
The German writer Karl May wrote two stories about Canada Bill Jones: Ein Self-man (1878) and Three carde monte (1879).  The narrator meets several times with the young Abraham Lincoln and together they oppose "Kanada-Bill." Later on, May revised the latter story for integration in Old Surehand II (1895), adding a fictional cause of death.

In the 1998 poker film Rounders, the main character, played by Matt Damon, quotes Canada Bill Jones, saying "It's immoral to let a sucker keep his money."

In Neil Gaiman's American Gods, Mr. Wednesday tells the "it's the only game in town" story about Canada Bill Jones, calling it the finest line of poetry ever spoken in America.

References

1830s births
Year of birth uncertain
1877 deaths
American confidence tricksters
American gamblers
Burials at Charles Evans Cemetery
People from Yorkshire
People from Colorado
People from Denver
American folklore
History of Denver
Canadian people of American descent
Pioneer history of Omaha, Nebraska
Crime in Omaha, Nebraska